Gusya may refer to:
Gusya, a diminutive of the Russian female first name Avgusta
Gusya, a diminutive of the Russian male first name Avgustin
Gusya, a diminutive of the Russian female first name Avgustina